Defendi is an Italian surname. Notable people with the surname include:

Edoardo Defendi (born 1991), Italian footballer
Marino Defendi (born 1985), Italian footballer
Rodrigo Defendi (born 1986), Brazilian footballer

Italian-language surnames